The Jimmy Watson Memorial Trophy is the most prestigious and sought after wine award in Australia. The trophy is a memorial to Jimmy Watson (died 1962), who established the iconic Jimmy Watson's Wine Bar in Lygon Street, Carlton, a suburb of Melbourne.

The trophy is awarded annually at the Melbourne Royal Wine Awards, conducted by Melbourne Royal (formally known as Royal Agricultural Society of Victoria to the Best Young Red Wine of the 2020 or 2021 vintage classes.

Past winners
Sources:

See also

References

External links 
 wineshow.com.au

Wine awards
Australian awards
Awards established in 1962
1962 establishments in Australia
Australian wine